Piret Järvis-Milder (born 6 February 1984 in Tallinn) is an Estonian television host and a singer, guitarist, and songwriter of the popular girl group Vanilla Ninja.

Born to Maire and Enno Järvis she has an older sister and a younger brother. After graduating high school she entered International University of Concordia where she was majoring in Media and Public Relations. Later she continued to study journalism at the University of Tartu. 

She was one of the four members to form Vanilla Ninja in 2002 and wrote lyrics for the song "Club Kung Fu" that made Vanilla Ninja well known in Estonia. She continued as a lyricist for many of the band's songs like "Birds Of Peace", "I Don't Care at All", "Black Symphony" etc. Although she initially played a more 'background' role in the group, she featured heavily on their 2005 album Blue Tattoo due to Maarja Kivi (the former lead singer) leaving in 2004. Järvis often acted as the spokesperson for the group in interviews, and on numerous occasions has been dubbed as the best looking and most stylish member. In 2005 she was voted Estonia's sexiest woman of the year by the readers of Estonia's best-selling gossip magazine Kroonika.

Järvis-Milder gave out the Estonian votes in Eurovision 2011, which mathematically confirmed Azerbaijan's first victory in the competition.

She has worked for different Estonian TV channels since 2002, including TV3, MTV Eesti, MTV Baltics, and is currently a host and a journalist at the Eesti Rahvusringhääling. She has hosted shows such as Pealtnägija, Eesti Laul, Jõulutunnel, and Terevisioon.

References

External links

1984 births
Living people
Singers from Tallinn
Estonian pop singers
21st-century Estonian women singers
Women guitarists
Vanilla Ninja members
Eurovision Song Contest entrants for Switzerland
Estonian television personalities